Heather Dorff is an American actress, writer, and producer currently living in Los Angeles, California.

Career
Dorff is probably best known for her roles in the 2011 short film "What They Say", which she also produced and co-wrote, and the 2013 feature film Truth or Dare. Dorff has also appeared in music videos, web series, and has been dubbed a "scream queen" and rising talent by Horror Society.

Dorff starred in the film The Tour alongside fellow scream queen Jessica Cameron, which has been shown in horror film festivals that include FrightFest in London and ScreamFest in Los Angeles. In 2020, Dorff’s latest film A Bad Place had its world premiere at Cinequest Film & Creativity Festival in San Jose before the festival had to be rescheduled due to growing COVID-19 safety concerns.

Achievements
Dorff has won, or been nominated for, performance awards from film festivals and organizations around the U.S. She won the 'Best Actress' award at the 2014 Chicago Horror Film Festival for her role in 'The Tour'. In 2012 she won 'Best Actress' or 'Best Female Performance' awards from The Critics Word, Chicago Horror Film Festival, Yuma Film Festival, and Ocean County Library Film Festival for her role in What They Say. She also won 'Best Actress' awards for her roles in Hand of Glory and the Ed Wood satire comedy and tribute film House of Degenerate Brain-Eating Mutant Fog Insects at the Prairie State Film Festival and Laugh or Die Comedy Film Festival, respectively.

Dorff was nominated for a 'Best Actress' award at the 2014 Indie Horror Film Festival for her role in Truth or Dare. She was also nominated 'Best Actress' at the 2012 Maverick Movie Awards for her role in Hand of Glory.

Filmography

Television and web series

References

External links
 
 
 Bio at HorrorSociety.com

1986 births
Actresses from Illinois
American film actresses
21st-century American actresses
Living people